Mount Gipps is a rural locality in the Scenic Rim Region, Queensland, Australia.

The locality borders New South Wales and is one end of the Queensland rabbit-proof fence.

Geography
Mount Gipps has high slopes to the south belonging to the McPherson Range and also in the north-east with a valley through the north-west and from west to east.

Running Creek, a tributary of the Logan River, flows from east to west through the locality. Mount Gipps Road enters from Chinghee Creek in the north-west and follows through the valley. Although entirely freehold land, only the lower valley areas have been cleared and are used for grazing. The slopes have an extensive tree cover.

History

In 1900, much of the land in the upper reaches of Running Creek was part of the rural property Telemon Crossing owned by A. Drynan.

There was a sawmill in Mount Gipps from at least 1920. It was located in the valley.

Mount Gipps State School was opened on 21 July 1920. It closed on 30 June 1954. It was at 220 Mount Gipps Road.

The locality contains 8 households, in which 30.0% of the population are males and 70.0% of the population are females with a median age of 52, 14 years above the national average. The average weekly household income is $0, $1,438 below the national average.

Education 
There are no schools in Mount Gibbs. The nearest government primary school is Hillview State School in Hillview to the north. The nearest government secondary school is Beaudesert State High School in Beaudesert further north.

References

External links

  — a description of the MacPherson Ranges in 1929, including Mount Gipps area

Scenic Rim Region
Localities in Queensland